Eftychia Karagianni (born October 10, 1973) is a female Greek water polo player and Olympic silver medalist with the Greece women's national water polo team.

She received a silver medal at the 2004 Summer Olympics in 2004 Athens.

She received a gold medal with the Greece women's national water polo team at the 2005 FINA Women's Water Polo World League in Kirishi, where she scored 19 goals.

See also
 List of Olympic medalists in water polo (women)

References

External links
 

1973 births
Living people
Greek female water polo players
Olympiacos Women's Water Polo Team players
Olympic water polo players of Greece
Water polo players at the 2004 Summer Olympics
Olympic silver medalists for Greece
Olympic medalists in water polo
Medalists at the 2004 Summer Olympics
Water polo players from Piraeus